California's 7th congressional district is a United States congressional district in California. Doris Matsui, a Democrat, has represented the district since January 2023.

Currently, it encompasses southern Sacramento County, part of Yolo County, and a tiny portion of Solano County. It includes all of Sacramento south of the American River, including Downtown Sacramento, the suburban cities of West Sacramento and Elk Grove, and the rural city of Galt. It is a heavily Democratic district. Prior to redistricting in 2021, it was entirely in Sacramento County and included the eastern and southern suburbs of Sacramento.

Competitiveness
The 7th is currently a solidly Democratic district, like most districts in the Bay Area, with a D+17 rating from the Cook Partisan Voting Index.

Voter registration
Registered voter statistics comes from the California Secretary of State:

Election results from statewide races

Composition

As of 2023, California's 7th congressional district is located in the Sacramento Valley, and encompasses most of Sacramento County and parts of Yolo.

Sacramento County is split between this district and both the 3rd district and 6th district. The 7th and 3rd districts are partitioned by Latrobe Rd. The 7th and 6th districts are partitioned by the Sacramento River, American River, Fair Oaks Blvd, Watt Ave, Kiefer Blvd, Highway 16, Bradshaw Rd, Highway E2, and Stonehouse Dr. The 7th district takes in the south side of the city of Sacramento, the cities of Galt and Elk Grove, and the census-designated places Florin and Parkway.

Yolo County is split between this district and 4th district. They are partitioned by Highway 84 and Elkhorn Slough on the southern border, and by County Rd 126, Tule Canal, Toe Drain Canal, Highway 84, Babel Slough Rd, and Pumphouse Rd. The 7th district takes in the city of West Sacramento, and most of Ryer Island.

Cities & CDP with 10,000 or more people
 Sacramento - 524,943
 Elk Grove - 178,997
 Vineyard - 39,800
 Galt - 26,536

List of representatives

Election results for representatives

1892

1894

1896

1898

1900

1902

1904

1906

1908

1910

1912

1914

1916

1918

1920

1922

1924

1926

1928

1930

1932

1934

1936

1938

1940

1942

1944

1946

1948

1950

1952

1954

1956

1958

1960

1962

1964

1966

1968

1970

1972

1974

1976

1978

1980

1982

1984

1986

1988

1990

1992

1994

1996

1998

2000

2002

2004

2006

2008

2010

2012

2014

2016

2018

2020

Historical district boundaries

See also
List of United States congressional districts

References

External links
GovTrack.us: California's 7th congressional district

07
Government of Sacramento County, California
Elk Grove, California
Folsom, California
Rancho Cordova, California
Constituencies established in 1893
1893 establishments in California